Charles-François Beautemps-Beaupré (6 August 1766 in La Neuville-au-Pont – 16 March 1854 in Paris) was a French hydrographer, hydrographic engineer and cartographer.

Biography
He accompanied the expedition sent in search of La Pérouse in 1791, and made valuable charts of many of the places it visited. Subsequently, he was employed in all of the important hydrographic labours undertaken during the First French Empire and the Bourbon Restoration.

He was elected a member of the Académie des sciences in 1810 and was appointed chief hydrographer and keeper of the Dépôt de la Marine (predecessor of the Naval Hydrographic and Oceanographic Service) in 1814. His work earned him the name “father of hydrography.”

Five navy ships have been named after him, and busts of him are to be found on the phare de Dunkerque and the phare de Goulphar (Belle-Île-en-Mer).

Works
An introduction to the practice of nautical surveying and the construction of sea charts

See also
 European and American voyages of scientific exploration

References

1766 births
1854 deaths
French cartographers
French hydrographers
18th-century French engineers
Members of the French Academy of Sciences
French oceanographers
Grand Officiers of the Légion d'honneur
Knights of the Order of Saint Louis
19th-century French engineers